Eduardo Ramos Escobedo (born 8 November 1949) is a Mexican former football defender who played for Mexico in the 1978 FIFA World Cup. He also played for C.D. Guadalajara.

References

External links
FIFA profile

1949 births
Mexico international footballers
Footballers from Sinaloa
Association football defenders
C.D. Guadalajara footballers
Liga MX players
1978 FIFA World Cup players
Living people
Mexican footballers
CONCACAF Championship-winning players